Constantin François de Chassebœuf, comte de Volney (3 February 175725 April 1820) was a French philosopher, abolitionist, writer, orientalist, and politician. He was at first surnamed Boisgirais after his father's estate, but afterwards assumed the name of Volney (which he had created as a contraction of Voltaire and Ferney).

Life

Early life and the French Revolution
Volney was born at Craon, Anjou (today in Mayenne), of a noble family. Initially interested in law and medicine, he went on to study classical languages at the University of Paris, and his Mémoire sur la Chronologie d'Hérodote (on Herodotus) rose to the attention of the Académie des Inscriptions and of the group around Claude Adrien Helvétius. Soon after, he befriended Pierre Jean George Cabanis, the Marquis de Condorcet, the Baron d'Holbach, and Benjamin Franklin.

He embarked on a journey to the East in late 1782 and reached Egypt, where he spent nearly seven months. He then lived for nearly two years in Greater Syria, in what today is Lebanon and Israel/Palestine, in order to learn Arabic. In 1785 he returned to France, where he spent the next two years compiling his notes and writing his Voyage en Egypte et en Syrie (1787) and Considérations sur la guerre des Turcs et de la Russie (1788).

He was a member both of the Estates-General and of the National Constituent Assembly after the outbreak of the French Revolution. In 1791 his essay on the philosophy of history appeared, Les Ruines, ou méditations sur les révolutions des empires. It conveys a vision predicting the union of all religions through the recognition of the common truths underlying them all.

Volney tried to put his politico-economic theories into practice in Corsica, where in 1792 he bought an estate and made an attempt to cultivate colonial produce. He was imprisoned during the Jacobin Club triumph, but escaped the guillotine. He spent some time as a professor of history at the newly founded École Normale.

Volney was a deist.

Negro Egypt 

He testified in particular to the Africanity of the ancient Egyptians. In describing the Sphinx , he attributed to its features and a head characterized as being Negro:

“But coming back to Egypt, the fact that it returns to history offers many reflections to philosophy. What a subject for meditation, to see the current barbarism and ignorance of the Copts (mestizo descended from the Greeks and the Egyptians), resulting from the alliance of the deep genius of the Egyptians and the brilliant spirit of the Greeks; to think that this race of black men, today our slave and the object of our contempt, is the very one to whom we owe our arts, our sciences and even the use of speech. Finally, to imagine that it is in the midst of peoples who call themselves the most friends of freedom and humanity that the most barbaric of slaveries has been sanctioned and questioned whether black men have an intelligence of species of white men!"

His story, the Voyage to Egypt and Syria had earned its author the suffrage of Empress Catherine II of Russia , who sent him a gold medal as a token of her satisfaction; it was in 1787 .

Later life

In 1795 he undertook a journey to the United States, where he was accused (1797) by John Adams' administration of being a French spy sent to prepare for the reoccupation of Louisiana by France and then to the West Indies. Consequently, he returned to France. The results of his travels took form in his Tableau du climat et du sol des États-Unis (1803).

He was not a partisan of Napoleon Bonaparte, but, being a moderate Liberal, was impressed into service by the First French Empire, and Napoleon made him a count and put him into the senate. After the Bourbon Restoration he was made a Peer of France, upon recognition of his hostility towards the Empire.  Chassebœuf became a member of the Académie française in 1795. In his later years he helped to found oriental studies in France, learning Sanskrit from the British linguist Alexander Hamilton, whom he had helped to protect during the Napoleonic era.

He died in Paris and was buried at the Père Lachaise Cemetery.

Thomas Jefferson's translation of Volney's Ruins of Empires
English translations of Volney's Ruins began appearing within a year or so of its first French edition but sometime during Volney's stay in the United States, he and Thomas Jefferson entered into a secret arrangement whereby Jefferson agreed to make a new English translation of the work. Volney visited Monticello for two weeks during June 1796.  The two men also met on several occasions at the American Philosophical Society, of which Volney had been made a member in 1797.  Jefferson was President of APS at the time and sponsored Volney's induction into the organization.  These meetings provided the two men with ample opportunity to conceive and discuss the translation project.

Jefferson, then serving as Vice President under John Adams, appreciated the book's central theme – that empires rise if government allows enlightened self-interest to flourish. This theme, Jefferson believed, represented an excellent summary of the Enlightenment-based principles upon which the U.S. was founded. However, Jefferson insisted that his translation be published only for certain readers, due to the book's controversial religious content. Jefferson was preparing to make a bid for the Presidency of the United States in 1800; he was worried his Federalist opponents would attack him as an atheist, if it were known he translated Volney's supposedly heretical book.

According to the evidence discovered by the French researcher Gilbert Chinard (1881-1972), Jefferson translated the invocation plus the first 20 chapters of the 1802 Paris edition of Volney's Ruins.  These first 20 chapters represent a review of human history from the point of view of a post-Enlightenment philosopher. Presumably, Jefferson then became too occupied with the 1800 Presidential campaign and didn't have time to finish the last four chapters of the book. In these chapters Volney describes "General Assembly of Nations," a fictionalized world convention wherein each religion defends its version of "the truth" according to its particular holy book. Since no religion is able to scientifically "prove" its most basic assertions, Volney concludes the book with a call for an absolute separation of church and state:

From this we conclude, that, to live in harmony and peace…we must trace a line of distinction between those (assertions) that are capable of verification, and those that are not; (we must) separate by an inviolable barrier the world of fantastical beings from the world of realities…

Since Jefferson did not have time to complete the translation project, the last four chapters were translated by Joel Barlow, an American land speculator and poet living in Paris. Barlow's name then became associated with the entire translation, further obscuring Jefferson's role in the project.

Christ myth theory
Volney and Charles-François Dupuis were the first modern writers to advocate the Christ myth theory, the view that Jesus had no historical existence. Volney and Dupuis argued that Christianity was an amalgamation of various ancient mythologies and that Jesus was a mythical character.  However, in his version of the Christ Myth theory, Volney allowed for an obscure historical figure whose life was integrated into a solar mythology. Thomas Jefferson and Benjamin Franklin were supporters of this theory.

Selected publications
Travels in Syria and Egypt, During the Years 1783, 1784, & 1785 (Volume 1, Volume 2, 1788)
The Ruins: Or a Survey of the Revolutions of Empires (1796)
New Researches on Ancient History (1819)
The Ruins; Or, Meditation on the Revolutions of Empires: And The Law of Nature (1890)

Legacy
Volney, New York was named after him.
Prix Volney was founded by Constantin Volney in 1803 and was originally a gold medal worth 1,200 francs.
The Volney Hotels in New York, Paris and Saumur were named after him.
Rue Volney was named after him in Paris, Angers, Mayenne, Brest, Lyon, Saumur and Clermont-Ferrand.
Boulevard Volney in Rennes, France and Laval, France.
Place Volney in Craon, France.
 An amphitheatre of the Faculty of Law, Economics and Management of the University of Angers bears his name.
 Collège Volney in Craon, France.
Volney Lodge is a Masonic lodge created in Laval (Mayenne).      
Cercle Volney was a circle of Artists and Writers in Paris.            
                              
Those are some of the places and things in the United States of America and France, which were named after him.

See also
 Volney prize
 Les Neuf Sœurs
 Society of the Friends of Truth

References

Further reading
 Caron, Nathalie. "Friendship, Secrecy, Transatlantic Networks and the Enlightenment: The Jefferson-Barlow Version of Volney’s Ruines (Paris, 1802)." Mémoires du livre/Studies in Book Culture 11.1 (2019). online
 Furstenberg, François. When the United States Spoke French: Five Refugees Who Shaped a Nation. New York: Penguin (2014).
 Katschnig, Gerhard. "The supportive voice in the midst of solitude and melancholy: Volney’s génie des tombeaux et des ruines." History of European Ideas 47.6 (2021): 958–973. 
 Kim, Minchul. "Volney and the French Revolution." Journal of the History of Ideas 79.2 (2018): 221–242.

External links
 
  
 The Ruins; or, Meditation on the Revolutions of Empires, and the Law of Nature of Nature, an English edition republished in 1920, PDF format
 Volney's Travels through Syria and Egypt, using the 'short s'. This version of the text does not use the long s, and may be easier for contemporary readers to understand.

1757 births
1820 deaths
18th-century French writers
18th-century French male writers
19th-century French writers
19th-century French male writers
Burials at Père Lachaise Cemetery
Christ myth theory proponents
Counts of the First French Empire
French abolitionists
French deists
French ethnologists
French male writers
French philosophers
French travel writers
Members of the Académie Française
Members of the American Philosophical Society
Peers of France
People from Mayenne